Henry Smith Lane (February 24, 1811 – June 19, 1881) was a United States representative, Senator, and the 13th Governor of Indiana; he was by design the shortest-serving Governor of Indiana, having made plans to resign the office should his party take control of the Indiana General Assembly and elect him to the United States Senate. He held that office for only two days, and was known for his opposition to slavery. A Whig until the party collapsed, he supported compromise with the south. He became an early leader in the Republican Party starting in 1856 serving as the president of the first party convention, delivering its keynote address, and was influential in the nomination of Abraham Lincoln. With the repeal of the Missouri Compromise, he became a full-fledged abolitionist, and in the Senate he was a pro-Union advocate and a strong supporter of the war effort to end the rebellion.

Early life

Family and background
Henry Smith Lane was born in Bath County, Kentucky near Sharpsburg on February 24, 1811, the son of James H. and Mary Higgins Lane.  He received a classical education from private tutors and studied law; he was admitted to the bar in Mount Sterling, Kentucky in 1832. He moved to Crawfordsville, Indiana, in 1835 working at the Bank of Indiana and opening a law office, taking mainly criminal cases.

Lane was an opponent of slavery early in life, and came to support Henry Clay while he lived in Kentucky. At age 20, he delivered an anti-slavery speech to the Colonization Society in October 1831. In the speech he declared, "The History of all times admonishes us that no man or community of men can be kept forever in slavery." While Lane opposed to expansion of slavery he was not in favor of abolition, but like Henry Clay he believed that over time slavery would die out if it was prevented from spreading. In 1833 he married Pamela Bledsoe Jameson. The couple had no children, and his wife was killed in a stage coach accident 1842; Lane escaped the accident with only minor injuries.

Active in Whig politics, he was a member of the Indiana Senate in 1837 as a representative of Montgomery County and a member of the Indiana House of Representatives in 1838–39. Lane was elected to the U.S. House of Representatives in 1840 to fill the vacancy caused by the resignation of Tilghman A. Howard, he won reelection defeating John Bryce by overwhelming majority the next year, and served until 1843. He did not seek reelection to a second full term. While in office, he was in favor of compromising with the south over the slavery issue and openly condemned the abolitionists agitators as promoting disunity.

Mexican–American War
During the 1844 elections, Lane stumped most of Indiana for presidential candidate Henry Clay. He married Joanna Maria Elston, a daughter of Isaac Compton Elston, a major investor in the Bank of Indiana in 1845. Lane returned to his law practice after the election and remained there until the outbreak of the Mexican–American War. In May 1846, Lane attended the war meeting held in Indianapolis, and became and active member, writing part of the resolutions the meeting issued, pledging troops for the invasion of Mexico.

After the meeting, Lane set out to personally raise a company of men to join the war effort, and he served during the war at its head, and rose to the rank of lieutenant colonel of the First Regiment Indiana Infantry. His regiment spent most of the war in Mexico, guarding supply lines and military posts, and saw little action. When his companies' enlistment expired, Lane returned to Indiana by ship, landing in Madison, Indiana. He there confronted many members of the Whig party who were opposed to the war and publicly decried their lack of support for the cause. Lane then set out to organize a new company and set out again for Mexico as part of the Fifth Indiana Regiment Infantry, and remained in Mexico for the duration of the war.

Shifting parties
After returning from the war, Lane was a candidate for Congress in 1849, challenging Joseph E. McDonald. The election was a close contest, but Lane was ultimately defeated and returned to private life. He abandoned the profession of law and engaged in the banking business at Crawfordsville in 1854. The same year the Know Nothing Party was established and Lane joined, along with many other disaffected Whigs. In the legislature he was a strong supporter of sending a Know-Nothing candidate to the United States Senate. The debate began the start of a period of divisive state politics that would continue until the American Civil War. The Democrats refused to allow the new party any national representation, and Ashbel Willard, who was President of the State Senate, was able to lock up voting and prevent any Senator from being elected. The situation exploded and the Know-Nothings responded by locking up the entire General Assembly.

The results were disastrous and the Know-Nothing party quickly fell apart, but the battle brought Lane national fame in standing up to the Democrats. In 1856 Lane attended the first Republican National Convention. He was elected president of the convention and gained national recognition for his oratory. After the convention he returned to Indiana and stumped the state for the new party. That year Republicans gained a strong representation in the General Assembly and, with the support of some Democrats, were able to elect Lane and William McCarty to the United States Senate. The two men went to Washington to challenge the state's sitting senators, but the Senate refused to accept the new senators.

In 1857, the Missouri Compromise was repealed. The act had a profound effect on Lane's position on slavery. While before he had supported compromise on the issue, the law's repeal led him to become a full-fledged abolitionist and favor anti-slavery action on the national level.

Republican

Gubernatorial campaign
Lane returned to Indiana where he continued to spread the ideas of the new party. In 1860, the state Republican convention chose Lane to run for governor, and Oliver Morton as lieutenant governor. They challenged Thomas Hendricks on the Democratic ticket. Prior to the election it was negotiated that Lane would be elected to the Senate and Morton would continue as governor. The men canvased the entire state.

After a major speech in Evansville, Lane attended the second Republican National Convention, and was influential in helping Abraham Lincoln win the presidential nomination. Lane and Lincoln had a friendly relationship and Lincoln once said of Lane, "Here comes an uglier man than I am".

Returning to Indiana after the convention, he held a final debate with Hendricks in Fort Wayne. Lane was not as skilled a debater as Hendricks, but was considered a superior orator. Lane refused to have any more debates with his opponent, and instead traveled across the state again giving speeches. The election was close and Lane defeated Hendricks by about 1,000 votes and was elected governor; he was inaugurated January 14, 1861. However, he served just two days, and resigned to accept a seat in the U.S. Senate to honor the agreement with running mate Morton, who then became governor.

Senator
Lane was again elected by the Republican-controlled Indiana Legislature, but again the Democratic-dominated U.S. Senate refused to seat him. As southern states began to secede from the Union, however, the Southern majority quickly gave way and Lane was permitted to be seated. He served from March 4, 1861, to March 3, 1867, and was a supporter of President Lincoln's policies during the Civil War. While in the Senate he was chairman of the Committee on Engrossed Bills (Thirty-seventh through Thirty-ninth Congresses) and a member of the Committee on Pensions (Thirty-ninth Congress).

Return to private life

After his Senate term ended, Lane returned to Crawfordsville, never again to hold elected office. He served as special Indian commissioner from 1869 to 1871, and was commissioner for improvement of the Mississippi River, appointed by President Ulysses S. Grant.

On June 18, 1881, Lane entertained some friends at his home in Crawfordsville for the evenings. After the party he began to have severe chest pains, and he died the next afternoon, June 19 around 1 pm, of an apparent heart-attack. His death was reported nationally, and biers were held nationwide. Lane was buried on June 21, his pallbearers being former governors of the state, and fellow senators. He was buried in a vault in Oak Hill Cemetery, and that state erected a monument over his grave.

See also

 List of governors of Indiana

References
Notes

Bibliography
 Dumas Malone (ed.), Dictionary of American Biography, vol. 5, part 2, New York:Charles Scribner's Sons (1961), pp. 574–575.

External links
 Retrieved on 2009-04-23
 
 Biography and Jacob Cox portrait from the Indiana Historical Bureau

1811 births
1881 deaths
Republican Party members of the Indiana House of Representatives
Republican Party Indiana state senators
Republican Party governors of Indiana
Indiana lawyers
American bankers
United States Army officers
People from Bath County, Kentucky
American military personnel of the Mexican–American War
People of Indiana in the American Civil War
Union (American Civil War) political leaders
People from Indiana in the Mexican–American War
Methodists from Indiana
Indiana Know Nothings
Republican Party United States senators from Indiana
Whig Party members of the United States House of Representatives from Indiana
19th-century American politicians
Burials in Indiana